Citylink (styled as CITYLINK) is a chain of shopping malls in Taiwan. It has four branches in Taipei, and a fifth branch in New Taipei is in preparation. All of the malls are connected to mass transit stations. 
The malls are owned by Ruentex Development Co (潤泰新), who opened the first Citylink mall in 2012 as part of the redevelopment of  Songshan station.

Branches

Songshan branch 
Citylink Songshan is a shopping mall in Xinyi District, Taipei, that opened on 18 December 2012. The mall occupies levels 1 to 3 of Songshan station.  The main core stores of the mall include Muji, Uniqlo, Hsin Tung Yang and various themed restaurants. The Songshan extension of the Songshan–Xindian line was beneficial for the business of the mall.

Nangang branch 

Citylink Nangang is a shopping mall in Nangang District, Taipei, that opened on 19 December 2014. The mall occupies levels 1 to 10 of Block C of the Ruentex Nangang Station Complex. It is the second store of Citylink, a Taiwanese chain shopping mall. Main core stores of the mall include Tsutaya Bookstore, Uniqlo, Century Asia Cinemas, and various themed restaurants.

Neihu branch 
Citylink Neihu is a shopping mall in Neihu District, Taipei, that opened on 29 March 2018. The mall occupies levels 1 and 2 of the Neihu metro station complex. It is the third store of Citylink, a Taiwanese chain shopping mall. Main core stores of the mall include Tsutaya Bookstore, Uniqlo, and various themed restaurants.

Future Sanchong branch 
Another branch in New Taipei is under construction in the Erchong Floodway, connecting to Sanchong metro station.

References 

Shopping malls in Taipei